Charles Francis Arnold Howard, 5th Earl of Wicklow (5 November 1839 – 20 June 1881) was an Anglo-Irish peer.

Howard was the eldest son of Rev. Hon. Francis Howard, the third son of William Howard, 3rd Earl of Wicklow and Eleanor Caulfeild. He was educated at Magdalen College, Oxford, before commissioning into the 11th Hussars as a cornet in 1860. He later transferred to the 9th Hussars.

He served as Aide-de-Camp to the Lord Lieutenant of Ireland between 1864 and 1866. In 1869 his uncle, William Howard, died, and Howard succeeded to his titles. In 1872 he was elected as an Irish representative peer and assumed his seat on the Conservative benches in the House of Lords. Between 1874 and 1879 Lord Wicklow was State Steward to the Lord Lieutenant of Ireland.

He did not marry, and was succeeded by his younger brother, Cecil Howard, following his death in 1881. Much of his life was spent defending himself against the legal challenge against him by Ellen Howard, wife of his late half-brother, William.

References

1839 births
1881 deaths
11th Hussars officers
Alumni of Magdalen College, Oxford
19th-century Anglo-Irish people
Conservative Party (UK) hereditary peers
Charles
Irish representative peers
5